Raven Rocks is an unincorporated community in Hampshire County within U.S. state of West Virginia. It lies on Springfield Pike (West Virginia Secondary Route 3) between the communities of Springfield and Millesons Mill.

References 

Unincorporated communities in Hampshire County, West Virginia
Unincorporated communities in West Virginia
Rock formations of West Virginia
Landforms of Hampshire County, West Virginia